Hairy daisy is a common name for several plants and may refer to:

Erigeron concinnus, native to the western United States
Erigeron incertus, native to the Falkland Islsands